is a passenger railway station located in the city of Hannō, Saitama, Japan, operated by the private railway operator Seibu Railway.

Lines

Station layout
The station consists of one island platform serving two tracks, connected to the station building by a level crossing.

History
The station opened on 14 October 1969.

Station numbering was introduced on all Seibu Railway lines during fiscal 2012, with Nishi-Agano Station becoming "SI32".

Passenger statistics
In fiscal 2019, the station was used by an average of 343 passengers daily, making it the 89th of the Seibu network's ninety-two stations

The passenger figures for previous years are as shown below.

Surrounding area
 
Hanno Municipal Office Agino Contact Information Office

References

External links
 Seibu Railway station information

Seibu Chichibu Line
Railway stations in Saitama Prefecture
Railway stations in Japan opened in 1969
Stations of Seibu Railway
Hannō